Scott Bulloch (born 13 August 1984) is an Australian footballer who plays for Sorrento FC.

A-League career statistics
(Correct as of 8 March 2010)

References

External links
 Oz Football profile

1984 births
A-League Men players
Australian police officers
Australian soccer players
Living people
Perth Glory FC players

Association football forwards
Association football midfielders